Alfred Arrowsmith (died 14 March 1935) was a Trinidadian cricketer. He played in two first-class matches for Trinidad and Tobago in 1907/08.

See also
 List of Trinidadian representative cricketers

References

External links
 

Year of birth missing
1935 deaths
Trinidad and Tobago cricketers